LEE may refer to:
 Law Enforcement Exploring
 Locus of Enterocyte Effacement, a pathogenicity island
 Lee railway station's National Rail station code
 Leesburg International Airport's IATA airport code
 Lee's Summit (Amtrak station)'s Amtrak station code
 Lake Erie and Eastern Railroad's reporting mark, an Ohio railroad

See also 
 Lee (disambiguation)